Harold Curtis "House" Gray (October 24, 1938 – April 30, 1990) was an American football player and coach of football and baseball. He served as the head football coach at the University of Maryland Eastern Shore from 1973 to 1977, compiling a record of 11–38. Gray was also the head baseball coach at Maryland Eastern Shore in 1973, tallying a mark of Gray 12–6. He played football and baseball at Maryland Eastern Shore when it was known as Maryland State College.

Head coaching record

Football

References

External links
 

1938 births
1990 deaths
American football offensive guards
Continental Football League players
Hampton Pirates football coaches
Maryland Eastern Shore Hawks baseball coaches
Maryland Eastern Shore Hawks baseball players
Maryland Eastern Shore Hawks football coaches
Maryland Eastern Shore Hawks football players
Sportspeople from Norfolk, Virginia
Coaches of American football from Virginia
Players of American football from Norfolk, Virginia
Baseball coaches from Virginia
Baseball players from Norfolk, Virginia
African-American coaches of American football
African-American players of American football
African-American baseball coaches
African-American baseball players
20th-century African-American sportspeople